Munro is a Scottish surname. In both languages, it means "man from the River Roe" in County Londonderry, Northern Ireland. The surname is common in Ross-shire and other areas of northern Scotland; it also spread to Canada via emigration. Variant spellings of the same name include Monro, Monroe, Munroe, Munrow and Manrow.

People with the name include:

A–F
 Adam Munro (born 1982), Canadian hockey player
 Alan Munro (immunologist) (born 1987), British immunologist and entrepreneur
 Alan Munro (jockey) (born 1967), British horse-racing rider
 Alex Munro (comedian) (1911–1986), Scottish actor and comedy figure
 Alex Munro (footballer born 1912) (1912–1984), Scottish football player
 Alex Munro (footballer born 1944), Scottish-born English football player
 Alexander Munro (athlete) (1870–1934), British Olympic athlete
 Alexander Munro (sculptor) (1825–1871), Scottish sculptor
 Alexander Munro of Bearcrofts (fl. 17th century), Scottish military leader
 Alice Munro (born 1931), Canadian author, recipient of the 2013 Nobel Prize in Literature
 Andrew Munro (bishop) (fl. 15th century), Scottish bishop in the Roman Catholic Church
 Andrew Munro (mathematician) (1869–1935), Mathematician and Fellow at Queens' College, Cambridge
 Anna Munro (1881–1962), Scottish social activist
 Bill Munro (born 1934), Scottish footballer
 Burt Munro (1899–1978), New Zealand motorcycle racer
 Camille Munro (born 1991), Miss World Canada winner
 Campbell Munro (1899–1943), South African cricketer
 Carmine "Maggie" Munro  (1931–2010), Aboriginal Australian leader
 Caroline Munro (born 1950), British actor and model
 Charles Ernest Monro (1874–1945), Scottish architect
 Charles H. Munro (1837–1908), Canadian physician and politician
 Charlie Munro (1917–1985), New Zealand-born Australian musician
 Colin Munro (born 1937), South African cricket player
 Dan Munro, Scottish footballer
 Dana Carleton Munro (1866–1933), US historian
 David H. Munro (born 1955), US physicist
 Donald Munro of Foulis (died 1039), Irish mercenary settler in Scotland and founder of the Clan Munro
 Donald W. Munro (1916–1998), Canadian politician
 Donnie Munro (born 1953), Scottish musician
 Douglas Munro (actor) (1866–1928), British actor
 Douglas Albert Munro (1919–1942), United States World War II hero in the United States Coast Guard
 Dugald Munro (1930–1973), Australian politician
 Dunc Munro (1901–1958), Canadian hockey player
 Edith Munro (1895–1983), United States Coast Guard officer
 Elgin Albert Munro (1874–1931), Canadian politician
 Eric Frank Russell (1905–1978), English author who used the pen name Duncan H. Munro
 Fayette S. Munro (1874–1921), American politician and lawyer
 Frank Munro (1947–2011), Scottish football player

G–L
 George Munro (philanthropist) (1825–1896), Canadian educator and philanthropist
 George Munro, 1st of Auchinbowie (fl. late 17th century), Scottish soldier
 George Munro, 1st of Culcairn (died 1746), Scottish soldier
 George Munro, 1st of Newmore (1602–1693), Scottish soldier and politician
 George Munro, 5th Baron of Foulis (fl. 13th century), Scottish leader
 Lieutenant-Colonel George Munro (1700–1757), Scottish soldier (also spelled Monro)
 Gerald Munro (1897–?), Canadian hockey player
 Grant Munro (filmmaker) (1923–2017), Canadian actor and film producer
 Grant Munro (footballer) (born 1980), Scottish football player
 Hamish Munro (1915-1994), Scottish biochemist and nutritionist
 Sir Harry Munro, 7th Baronet (1720–1781), Scottish military leader and politician
 Hector Hugh Munro (1870–1916), British author using the pen name Saki
 Hector Munro, 8th of Novar (1726–1805), Scottish military leader
 Henry M. Munro (1840–1915), Canadian politician
 Henry Munro (Canada West politician) (1802–1874), Canadian politician
 Henry Munro (United Irishman) (1758–1798), Irish independence figure
 Hope Munro (born 1981), Australian field hockey player
 Hugh Andrew Johnstone Munro of Novar (1797–1864), Scottish art collector 
 Hugh Andrew Johnstone Munro (1819–1885), Scottish classical scholar
 Hugh Munro or Monroe (Rising Wolf) (1799-1892) Canadian fur trapper who joined the Blackfeet Nation.
 Hugh Munro (Canadian politician) (1854–1939), Canadian politician
 Hugh Munro, 9th Baron of Foulis (f. 15th century), Scottish leader
 Iain Munro (born 1951) Scottish football player
 Ian Munro (disambiguation), several people
 Ian Munro (pianist) (born 1963), Australian musician
 Ingrid Munro (fl. 20th century), Swedish-born social activist in Kenya
 James Munro (disambiguation), several people
 James Mitchell (writer) (1926–2002), British author who used the pen name James Munro
 James Munro (Australian politician) (1832–1908), Premier of Victoria
 James Munro (VC) (1826–1871), Scottish soldier and war hero
 Jim Munro (1870–1945), New Zealand politician
 Jim Munro (born 1962), British journalist
 Jimmy Munro (1870–1899), Scottish football player
 Janet Munro (1932–1972), British actor
 Jock Munro (1893–1917), Scottish footballer
 John Munro, 9th of Teaninich (1778–1858), Scottish soldier of the British H.E.I.C
 John Munro (loyalist) (~1728-1800) Scottish soldier opposing the American Revolution who later settled in Canada.
 John Neil Munro (born 1959), Scottish author and journalist
 Jonathan Munro, British journalist
 Julia Munro (fl. 1990s–2000s), Canadian politician
 Lachie Munro (born 1986), New Zealand rugby player
 Les Munro (1919–2015), English WWII pilot and war hero
 Leslie Munro (1901–1974), New Zealand lawyer and politician
 Libby Munro (born 1981), Australian actress 
 Lily Oddie Munro (1937–2021), Canadian politician formerly called Lily Oddie Munro
 Lyall Munro Jnr (born 1951), Aboriginal Australian activist and elder
 Lyall Munro Snr (1931–2020), Aboriginal Australian activist and elder
 Lochlyn Munro (born 1966), Canadian actor

M–Z
 "Maggie" (Carmine) Munro  (1931–2010), Aboriginal Australian leader
 Malcolm Munro (born 1953), English footballer
 Mike Munro (born 1952), Australian television personality
 Morndi Munro, the last fluent speaker of the Unggumi language of Western Australia
 Neil Gordon Munro (1863–1942), Scottish-born Japanese physician
 Neil Munro (actor) (1947–2009), Canadian actor, director and playwright
 Neil Munro (footballer) (1868–1948), Scottish football player 
 Neil Munro (writer) (1863–1930), Scottish author who sometimes used pen name Hugh Foulis
 Norman Munro (1842–1894), US newspaper publisher
 Pamela Munro (born 1947), US linguist
 Patrick Munro (1883–1942), British politician
 Pete Munro (born 1975), US baseball player
 Peter Jay Munro (1767–1833), American politician and lawyer
 Rob Munro (fl. 1980s–1990s), New Zealand politician
 Robert Monro sometimes also spelt Munro. 17th century Scottish general
 Robert Munro (disambiguation), several people
 Robert Munro (rugby footballer)
 Robert Munro, 6th Baron of Foulis (fl. 14th century), Scottish leader
 Robert Munro, 14th Baron of Foulis (died 1547), Scottish leader
 Robert Mor Munro, 15th Baron of Foulis (fl. 16th century), Scottish leader
 Robert Munro, 18th Baron of Foulis (died 1633), Scottish leader
 Robert Munro, 1st Baron Alness (1868–1955), Scottish politician and judge
 Sir Robert Munro, 3rd Baronet (fl. 17th century), Scottish leader
 Sir Robert Munro, 5th Baronet (died 1729), Scottish leader
 Sir Robert Munro, 6th Baronet (1684–1746), Scottish military leader
 Rona Munro (born 1959), Scottish author
 S. Sterling Munro, Jr. (1932–1992), US lawyer
 Samantha Munro (born 1990), Canadian actor
 Sandy Munro (born 1949), US automotive engineer
 Stuart Munro (born 1962), Scottish football player
 Stuart Munro (born 1964-2002), Musician, Kolkata, India
 Thalia Munro (born 1982), US water polo player
 Thomas Munro (art historian) (1897–1974), US art historian
 Thomas Munro (solicitor) (1866–1923), Scottish public figure
 Tony Munro (1963/63 – 2016), Australian sports journalist
 Sir Thomas Munro, 1st Baronet (1761–1827), Scottish soldier
 Wilfred Harold Munro (1849–1934), US historian
 William Munro (disambiguation), several people

References

See also
 Munro (disambiguation)
 Monro (disambiguation)
 Monroe (surname)
 Munroe (disambiguation)

Scottish surnames
Surnames of Irish origin